The 2006 Estoril Open was a tennis tournament played on outdoor clay courts. This event was the 17th edition of the Estoril Open for the men (the 10th for the women), included in the 2006 ATP Tour International Series and in the 2006 WTA Tour Tier IV Series. Both the men's and the women's events took place at the Estoril Court Central, in Oeiras, Portugal, from 1 May through 7 May 2006.

Finals

Men's singles

 David Nalbandian defeated  Nikolay Davydenko, 6–3, 6–4

Women's singles

 Zheng Jie defeated  Li Na, 6–7(5–7), 7–5, retired

Men's doubles

 Lukáš Dlouhý /  Pavel Vízner defeated  Lucas Arnold /  Leoš Friedl, 6–3, 6–1

Women's doubles

 Li Ting /  Sun Tiantian defeated  Gisela Dulko /  María Sánchez Lorenzo, 6–2, 6–2

External links
Official website
Men's Singles draw
Men's Doubles draw
Women's Singles, Doubles and Qualifying Singles draws

 
May 2006 sports events in Europe